Cathouse: The Series is an HBO television series that documents the professional lives of the workers at the Moonlite BunnyRanch, a legal brothel in Nevada. The 11 episodes of the first season were originally broadcast in 2005; 6 episodes of the second season aired two years later. The series is the direct successor of the HBO documentaries Cathouse (2002) and Cathouse 2: Back in the Saddle (2003), which also focused on the Bunny Ranch. On New Year's Day 2008 at 12:05am, HBO aired a special episode of the series titled "Cathouse the Musical."  Also in 2008, two standalone episodes (not part of a full season) aired - "Cathouse: Come to the Party" and "Best of Cathouse."

Unlike the specials, which showed only the negotiations between brothel workers and their clients, the series was more sexually explicit and showed sexual activity with customers. Regulars on the series include Moonlite owner Dennis Hof, his then girlfriend Sunset Thomas (a porn star who was also a Moonlite employee), Air Force Amy, Isabella Soprano, Brooke Taylor (who became Hof's girlfriend after Thomas departed) and Danielle.

In October, November and December 2008, three new specials aired, "Ménage à Trois," "What's on the Menu?" and "Three Ring Circus,". In October 2009 a special titled "Sex, Guys and Videotape", aired which included footage of the Bunny Ranch shot by the working girls themselves.

In December 2010 a special titled "Cat Call" aired and in February 2011 another special aired titled "Welcome Aboard," it featured a visit from Heidi Fleiss. Both of these episodes include the introduction of a new group of women, including Hof's newest girlfriend, Cami Parker, while continuing to feature Brooke Taylor, Bunny Love and Air Force Amy. In December 2011 a new special aired titled "Frisky Business".

The original "Cathouse" special was released to DVD in North America in 2005. The first two seasons, plus Cathouse: The Musical were released in a 4-disc set in September 2008.  A second DVD set was released in December 2010, including "Come to the Party," the third season of three episodes, "Sex, Guys and Videotape" and the "Best of Cathouse."

See also
Prostitution in Nevada

References

External links
 

HBO original programming
Prostitution in American television
2000s American reality television series
2010s American reality television series
2005 American television series debuts
2014 American television series endings
English-language television shows
Television series by Warner Bros. Television Studios
Erotic television series